Olpodiplosis is a genus of gall midges, insects in the family Cecidomyiidae. There is at least one described species in Olpodiplosis, O. helianthi.

References

Further reading

 
 
 
 
 

Cecidomyiinae
Cecidomyiidae genera
Articles created by Qbugbot